This is a list of United States ambassadors to Tajikistan.

Until 1991, Tajikistan had been a constituent republic of the Soviet Union as the Tajik Soviet Socialist Republic. On December 25, 1991, following the dissolution of the Soviet Union, Tajikistan declared its independence and became the Republic of Tajikistan. The United States government recognized Tajikistan on the same day. Diplomatic relations were established on February 19, 1992 in an announcement by President Bush. A temporary embassy was opened by Chargé d'Affaires ad interim Edmund McWilliams on March 13, 1992 in the Avesto Hotel, pending the appointment of an ambassador. The first ranking ambassador was Stanley Tuemler Escudero, who presented his credentials on October 19, 1992.

On October 25, 1992, six days after Ambassador Escudero's arrival, Embassy Dushanbe was closed and all U.S. personnel were withdrawn because of the civil war in Tajikistan. The embassy was reopened on March 11, 1993.

In 1998, after the embassy bombings in Africa, Embassy Dushanbe American personnel were temporarily relocated to Almaty, Kazakhstan, due to heightened Embassy security standards. American Embassy Dushanbe has since returned to full operations and in July 2006 moved into a purpose-built embassy compound.

Ambassadors

See also
Tajikistan – United States relations
Foreign relations of Tajikistan
Ambassadors of the United States

References

United States Department of State: Background notes on Tajikistan

External links
 United States Department of State: Chiefs of Mission for Tajikistan
 United States Department of State: Tajikistan
 United States Embassy in Dushanbe

Tajikistan
United States